Sister Benten Online (also known as Pacific Ocean Studios) is a record label based in Japan. It is predominantly female, and features Oi! music. The operator of the label is Audrey Kimura. Since 1994, The record label has produced over 30 releases.

Bands On Sister Benten Records
 Petty Booka
 Hang On The Box
 Titan Go King's
 Nonstop Body
 Last Target
 Brain Failure
 Lolita No. 18
 Mummy the Peepshow
 Soap Land Momiyama
 Candy Eyeslugger 
 Bu*Li
 O*N*T*J
 Tsu Shi Ma Mi Re
 Red Bacteria Vacuum

The label sponsors the Wild Wacky Party punk rock concert series.

See also 
 List of record labels

References

External links
 Benten Label & Sister Records

Japanese record labels
Punk record labels
Companies established in 1980